Andrey Rafael Quintino dos Santos (born 5 August 2002), known as Andrey Quintino , is a Brazilian footballer who plays for Ituano, on loan from Santos. Mainly a forward, he can also play as a right back.

Club career
Born in Santos, São Paulo, Quintino joined Santos' youth setup in 2017, after representing Ponte Preta and Sumaré. On 29 August 2019, he signed his first professional contract with the club.

Quintino impressed Santos' first team manager Cuca during an under-20 match in 2020, where he played as a right back, but did not manage to feature in a first-team match due to injuries. He further extended his contract with Peixe on 23 December of that year, and subsequently continued to appear with the under-20s.

On 10 January 2023, Quintino was loaned to Série B side Ituano until 3 July, being presented at his new club the following day. He made his professional debut fifteen days later, coming on as a second-half substitute for Eduardo Person in a 3–1 Campeonato Paulista home loss against Palmeiras.

Personal life
Quintino is the son of Ademir Quintino, a journalist who covers Santos.

Career statistics

References

2002 births
Living people
Sportspeople from Santos, São Paulo
Footballers from São Paulo (state)
Brazilian footballers
Association football defenders
Association football forwards
Santos FC players
Ituano FC players